Breitenstein is a small town in the Austrian state of Lower Austria.  It is one of the towns found on the Semmering Railway line which is a UNESCO World Heritage Site.  Translated from German the name means "Broad Stone" due to its large rock faces.

Population

References

External links 
 
  

Cities and towns in Neunkirchen District, Austria